The Lower Alloways Creek Township School District is a community public school district that serves students in pre-kindergarten through eighth grade from Lower Alloways Creek Township, in Salem County, New Jersey, United States.

As of the 2018–19 school year, the district, comprising one school, had an enrollment of 167 students and 20.2 classroom teachers (on an FTE basis), for a student–teacher ratio of 8.3:1. In the 2016–17 school year, Lower Alloways Creek Township had the 32nd smallest enrollment of any school district in the state, with 159 students.

The district is classified by the New Jersey Department of Education as being in District Factor Group "CD", the sixth-highest of eight groupings. District Factor Groups organize districts statewide to allow comparison by common socioeconomic characteristics of the local districts. From lowest socioeconomic status to highest, the categories are A, B, CD, DE, FG, GH, I and J.

Public school students in ninth through twelfth grades attend Salem High School in Salem City, together with students from Elsinboro Township, Mannington Township and Quinton Township, as part of a sending/receiving relationship with the Salem City School District. As of the 2018–19 school year, the high school had an enrollment of 374 students and 44.0 classroom teachers (on an FTE basis), for a student–teacher ratio of 8.5:1.

School
Lower Alloways Creek Elementary School had an enrollment of 163 students in grades PreK-8 during the 2018–19 school year.

Administration
Core members of the district's administration are:
Susan Schaffer, Chief School Administrator
Shannon DuBois-Brody, Business Administrator / Board Secretary

Board of education
The district's board of education, with seven members, sets policy and oversees the fiscal and educational operation of the district through its administration. As a Type II school district, the board's trustees are elected directly by voters to serve three-year terms of office on a staggered basis, with either two three seats up for election each year held (since 2012) as part of the November general election. The board appoints a superintendent to oversee the day-to-day operation of the district.

References

External links
Lower Alloways Creek Elementary School

School Data for the Lower Alloways Creek Elementary School, National Center for Education Statistics

Lower Alloways Creek Township, New Jersey
New Jersey District Factor Group CD
School districts in Salem County, New Jersey
Public K–8 schools in New Jersey